Gary Lugg (born 5 June 1958) is a former Australian rules footballer who played with St Kilda in the Victorian Football League (VFL).

Lugg's daughter, Rheanne, plays for Brisbane in the AFL Women's (AFLW).

References

External links 

Living people
1958 births
Australian rules footballers from Victoria (Australia)
St Kilda Football Club players
Golden Point Football Club players